Mangamma Sapadham is a 1965 Indian Telugu-language film, produced by D. V. S. Raju under the D. V. S. Productions banner and directed by B. Vittalacharya. It stars  N. T. Rama Rao and Jamuna, with music composed by T. V. Raju. The film is a remake of the 1943 Tamil film of the same name.

Plot 
Once upon a time, there was a kingdom, its king Raja (N. T. Rama Rao) is a big womanizer. Mangamma a beautiful village girl who has a lot of self-esteem. Once Raja sees Mangamma and truly falls in love with her at first sight itself. Raja requests her to marry him, but she rejects and insults him. Angered Raja challenges her that he will take revenge against her by marrying and locking her virginity throughout life. Therefore, Mangamma also takes a vow that without his knowledge she will have a son with him and she will make the child whip him in his court. Raja marries Managamma and locks her in a secret palace. Here Mangamma plots and digs a tunnel from her house to the palace with the help of her father Narasaiah (Mikkilineni) & brother Baja Govindam (Relangi) and secretly escapes. She changes her attire as a tribal, attracts Raja, spends one night with him and takes his ring as a proof. After that, Mangamma gives birth to a child Vijay (again N. T. Rama Rao) and introduces him as his brother son to the world. Vijay falls in love with Chief Commander's (Rajanala) daughter Vijaya (L. Vijayalaksmi). Knowing this, his grandfather scolds him and sends him to his mother through the tunnel where he sees his father harassing his mother every day; when he asks his mother she reveals the entire story. Now Vijay decides to teach a lesson to his father, he teases his father in various forms of disguise and fulfills his mother's vow by beating him with the whip in the court. Mangamma comes and stops him, says that the boy is his own and proves it with the proper witnesses. At last, Raja realizes his mistakes, apologizes to Mangamma and accepts her as his queen. Finally, the movie ends on a happy note with Vijay & Vijaya.

Cast 
N. T. Rama Rao as Raja & Vijay (dual role)
Jamuna as Mangamma
Rajanala as Sainyadhipathi
Relangi as Bhaja Govindam
Ramana Reddy as Kotvalu
Allu Ramalingaiah as Rathalu
Mikkilineni as Narasaiah
Balakrishna as Joogulu
L. Vijayalakshmi as Vijaya
Vanisri as Chenchela
Rajashree as Dancer
Girija as Manjeera
Chayadevi as Seeta

Soundtrack 
Music composed by T. V. Raju.

References

External links 
 * 

1960s Telugu-language films
1965 films
Films directed by B. Vittalacharya
Films scored by T. V. Raju
Telugu remakes of Tamil films